In mathematics, a Markov information source, or simply, a Markov source, is an information source whose underlying dynamics are given by a stationary finite Markov chain.

Formal definition
An information source is a sequence of random variables ranging over a finite alphabet Γ, having a stationary distribution.

A Markov information source is then a (stationary) Markov chain M, together with a function

that maps states S in the Markov chain to letters in the alphabet Γ.

A unifilar Markov source is a Markov source for which the values  are distinct whenever each of the states  are reachable, in one step, from a common prior state.  Unifilar sources are notable in that many of their properties are far more easily analyzed, as compared to the general case.
00

Applications
Markov sources are commonly used in communication theory, as a model of a transmitter. Markov sources also occur in natural language processing, where they are used to represent hidden meaning in a text.  Given the output of a Markov source, whose underlying Markov chain is unknown, the task of solving for the underlying chain is undertaken by the techniques of hidden Markov models, such as the Viterbi algorithm.

See also
Entropy rate

References
Robert B. Ash, Information Theory, (1965) Dover Publications. 

Markov processes
Statistical natural language processing